Irfan Fadhilah (born 2 July 1990) is an Indonesian badminton player affiliated with Jaya Raya Jakarta club.

Achievements

BWF Grand Prix 
The BWF Grand Prix had two levels, the Grand Prix and Grand Prix Gold. It was a series of badminton tournaments sanctioned by the Badminton World Federation (BWF) and played between 2007 and 2017.

Mixed doubles

  BWF Grand Prix Gold tournament
  BWF Grand Prix tournament

BWF International Challenge/Series 
Men's doubles

Mixed doubles

  BWF International Challenge tournament
  BWF International Series tournament

Performance timeline

Individual competitions 
 Senior level

References

External links 
 

1990 births
Living people
Sportspeople from West Java
Indonesian male badminton players